Saint Dominicans, or simply Dominicans, also known as Saint Dominguans, or Dominguans, are the people who lived in the French colony of Saint-Domingue before the Haitian Revolution. Dominican Creoles formed an ethnic group native to Saint-Domingue, they were all of the people who were born in Saint Domingue. The Creoles were well educated, and they created much art, such as the famed St. Dominican French Opera; their society prized manners, good breeding, tradition, and honor. During and after the Haitian Revolution, many St. Dominicans fled to locations in the United States, other Antilles islands, New York City, Cuba, France, Jamaica, and especially New Orleans in Louisiana, where they made an enormous impact on Louisiana Creole culture.

St. Dominican Society

Origin of the Dominican Creoles
French adventurers settled on Tortuga Island, which was close to the Spanish colony of Santo Domingo. As a result, in the late 17th century, the French had de facto control of the island close to the Spanish colony. The wars of Louis XIV of France in Europe finally convinced the Spaniards to give the western quarter of the island to the French under to the Treaty on Ryswick (1697). The French called their new colony Saint-Domingue. As the colony developed, a planter class emerged that created highly profitable plantations- these plantations generated so much wealth that Saint-Domingue soon became the richest colony in the world.

In the late 17th century, French colonists made up more than 90% of the population in Saint-Domingue. However, as demand for sugar in Europe grew, planters imported African slaves to meet the demand. The population of Africans grew quickly, and many French settlers intermarried with Africans, resulting in the growth of a multiracial Creole population. By the early 18th century, Dominican Creoles and Africans came to compose the majority of the colony.

Throughout the 17th century, French Creoles became established in the Americas as a unique ethnicity originating from the mix of French, Indian, and African cultures. These French Creoles held a distinct ethno-cultural identity, a shared antique language, the Creole French language, and their civilization owed its existence to the overseas expansion of the French Empire. Martinique for a time was the center of French Creoles in the Caribbean; its decline lead to Saint-Domingue becoming the capital of the West Indian Creole civilization.

St. Dominican society

Saint-Domingue had the largest and wealthiest free population of color in the Caribbean; they were known as the Gens de couleur libres (free people of color). Population estimations in 1789 indicate 28,000 to 32,000 affranchis & Creoles of color  and 40,00 to 45,000 St. Dominican whites, which included the larger group of petits blancs (white commoners) consisting of Creoles of lighter complexions, French subjects, engagés (white indentured servants), and foreign European immigrants & refugees; and the tiny, exclusive group of grands blancs (white nobles) of whom the majority lived in France, and the slave population totalled between 406,000 and 465,000. While many of the Gens de couleur libres were affranchis (ex-slaves), most members of this class were Creoles of color, i.e. free born blacks and mulattoes. As in New Orleans, a system of plaçage developed, in which white men had a kind of common-law marriage with slave or free mistresses, and provided for them with a dowry, sometimes freedom, and often education or apprenticeships for their children. Some such descendants of planters inherited considerable property.

While the French controlled Saint-Domingue, they maintained a class system which covered both whites and free people of color. These classes divided up roles on the island and established a hierarchy. The highest class, known as the grands blancs (white noblemen), was composed of rich nobles, including royalty, and mainly lived in France. These individuals held most of the power and controlled much of the property on Saint-Domingue. Although their group was very small and exclusive, they were quite powerful.

Below the grands blancs were the petits blancs (white commoners) and the gens de couleur libres (free people of color). These classes inhabited Saint Domingue and held a lot of local political power and control of the militia. Petits blancs shared the same societal level as gens de couleur libres.

The Gens de couleur libres class was made up of affranchis (ex-slaves), free-born blacks, and mixed-race people, and they controlled much wealth and land in the same way as petits blancs; they held full citizenship and civil equality with other French subjects. Race was initially tied to culture and class, and some "white" St. Dominicans had non-white ancestry.

Development of Creole culture

Saint-Domingue underwent a cultural awakening in the years after the French and Indian War, where France lost all of its continental New France territory (French Louisiana, French Canada, and Acadia). Imperial French policy makers worried that future conflicts could test the loyalty of their St. Dominican subjects, and as Saint-Domingue was the richest colony in the world, they couldn't afford to lose it. The Bourbon Regime thus expanded the colonial bureaucracy, hired administrative personnel, built new infrastructure, and started a colonial mail service as well as a St. Dominican printing press. St. Dominican entrepreneurs also added to the colony's development by building cafés and clubs.

The urban society of Saint-Domingue became rich and thrived. The French Opera was one of the most cherished arts in Saint-Domingue. Eight St. Dominican towns had theaters, the largest being in the capital of Cap-Français that could hold 1,500 spectators. There were also Masonic lodges, and many universities espousing French Enlightenment ideas. Saint-Domingue was home to the Cercle des Philadelphes, a scientific organization of which the American scientist Benjamin Franklin was a member.

Saint-Domingue developed a highly specialized and differentiated economy, and art and entertainment were abundant on the island. Public festivals such as masquerade balls, the celebration of feasts & holidays, and charivaris became engrained in St. Dominican culture. A transient population also became present in St. Dominican society, and tourists from different cultures and classes would stream to the major city-centers of the island, such as Cap-Français and Port-au-Prince.

By 1789, St. Dominican society was already old and refined, with its own customs, traditions, and values. The core of Dominican Creole civilization was transferred to New Orleans, Louisiana after the Haitian Revolution.

Freedoms of the Creoles and Affranchis
In 1685, French administrators published a slave code based on Roman laws, the Code Noir. Discipline, the colonial government, rural police, and the ability for social promotion prevented slave uprisings in Saint-Domingue; in the British colonies such as Jamaica, a dozen large slave rebellions occurred in the 18th century alone. Saint-Domingue never had a slave rebellion until the beginning of the 1791 St. Dominican French revolution.

The Code Noir  based on Roman laws also conferred affranchis (ex-slaves) full citizenship and gave complete civil equality with other French subjects. Saint Domingue's Code Noir never outlawed interracial marriage, nor did it limit the amount of property a free person could give to affranchis. Dominican Creoles of color and affranchis used the colonial courts to protect their property and sue white St. Dominicans.

During the 18th century Saint Domingue became home to the largest and wealthiest free population of African descent anywhere in the Americas. The existence of wealthy families of African descent challenged the ideas from which the plantation society emerged. For much of the 18th century, colonists used social class rather than genealogy to define position in St. Dominican society.

St. Dominican census records show that families of African ancestry who owned property, were educated, and were legitimately married were listed as white St. Dominicans by officials; racial identites were tied to wealth and culture rather than ancestry.

Slavery in Saint-Domingue
Planters took care to treat slaves well in the beginning of their time on the plantation, and they slowly integrated slaves into the plantation's labor system. On each plantation there was a black commander who supervised the other slaves on behalf of the planter, and the planter made sure not to favor one African ethnic group over others.

Most slaves who came to Saint-Domingue worked in fields or shops; younger slaves often became household servants, and old slaves were employed as surveillants. Some slaves became skilled workmen, and they received privileges such as better food, the ability to go into town, and liberté des savanes (savannah liberty), a sort of freedom with certain rules. Slaves were considered to be valuable property, and slaves were attended by doctors who gave medical care when they were sick.

Here is a description of how the liberté des savanes (savannah liberty) Creole custom worked:

African presence in Saint-Domingue

The vast majority of the slaves in Saint-Domingue were war-captives who had lost a war with another ethnic group. Most slaves came from ethnic tension between different tribes and kingdoms, or religious wars between pagans and Muslim-pagan interreligious wars. Many of the slaves who came to Saint-Domingue could not return to Africa, as their home was controlled by an opposing African ethnic group, and they stayed as affranchis in Saint-Domingue.

As African freedmen had full citizenship and civil equality with other French subjects, they took an interest in expanding the studies of each of their unique people's history. Africans contributed to the spiritual and mythological aspects of Saint-Domingue through their folklore, such as the widespread tales of Compère Lapin and Compère Bouqui.

Below is a list of different African peoples found in Saint-Domingue:

The Bambaras. Bambara was often used as a generic term for African slaves. European traders used Bambara as a term for defining vaguely a region of ethnic origin. Muslim traders and interpreters often used Bambara to indicate Non-Muslim captives. Slave traders would sometimes identify their slaves as Bambara in hopes of securing a higher price, as Bambara slaves were sometimes characterized as being more passive. Further confusing the name's indication of ethnic, linguistic, religious, or other implications, the concurrent Bambara Empire had notoriety for its practice of slave-capturing wherein Bambara soldiers would raid neighbors and capture the young men of other ethnic groups, forcibly assimilate them, and turn them into slave soldiers known as Ton. The Bambara Empire depended on war-captives to replenish and increase its numbers; many of the people who called themselves Bambara were indeed not ethnic Bambara.
 The Dunkos, a tattooed people whose women cherished their men with the utmost respect.
 The Aradas, a tattooed people who used poison to kill their enemies. They worshipped the moon, mollusks, and serpents. Toussaint Louverture was reportedly of Arada heritage.
 The people of Juida, a tattooed people whose women were known to be extroardinarily flirtatious. The women of Juida wore a heavy ring inside of their bottom lip, and the skin of their throat was modified with cuts of a knife.
 The people of Essa who religiously worshipped the dead king of their people as a divinity. They place his body in a pagoda following the main route of their capital on a richly ornamented throne, and worship him until the reigning King of Essa dies. The cadavre is embalmed with palm oil which conserves the body's freshness for a long time. The body is dressed very extravagantly, and a guardian watches it day and night as travelers come to visit and pay respects.
 The people of Urba, a fierce people who are arbitrary in their resolutions of revenge. If a murder takes place, the dead's relatives do not search for the killer; rather, they will hide and will disembowel the first passer-by without fear of a judiciary backlash, offering the victim's life as a sacrifice to their god Brataoth. They prepare the funeral of their relative, leaving the corpse of their victim exposed to the air, and devoured by ferocious beasts. They dig a huge trench where the murder was committed, so that the spirit of the dead may not wander to other places. The cadaver is embalmed and exposed and placed in an iron cage, so that the body is not touching the ground. For this reason the body is safe from carnivorous animals as they cannot get through the iron bars and the deepness of the trench. A little hut is constructed above the cage so that the weather does not interfere with the body.

The King of Urba often calls meetings of magic men that are called Makendals, whose purpose is to foresee the results of battles, and in the event of a defeat, to indicate which soldiers were responsible for the failure of the battle; the Makendals many times would arbitrarily call upon innocent men to face punishment for "criminal conduct" leading to the defeat.

When the King of Urba loses many of his people to war, he assembles the Makendal council, and consults the members on the way to repopulate his kingdom, where he is recommended to buy 1.one hundred gourde vases, 2.one hundred jugs, 3.one hundred slaves. The Makendals transport all of these  on the major roadway, and order the slaves' bodies to be opened, where they  pour red palm oil inside and specific shells, and bury all of these items at a specific location. This is the ritual of repopulation to gain favor from their gods.

 The Aminas who believed in metempsychosis, or the migration of the soul after death. When slaves from this ethnic group would arrive in Saint-Domingue, some would use suicide to return to the country of whence they came, believing that they would regain the rank, wealth, relatives, and friends that they lost after they were defeated in war.

For an example, an account of this metempsychosis occurred on the plantation of Mr.Desdunes, who had purchased an Amina woman and her two children. The woman and children had barely arrived on the island, and the woman was witnessed observing the Ester river, stopping every moment to measure the depth of the river, and making sighs while lifting her eyes to the sky.

One morning, the Amina woman was found drowned with her two children attached on her belt. The children's screams for help, echoing the horrors of their soon-to-be death, were heard by African fishermen, but not knowing to what to attribute the cause, they didn't go to the location to render aid.

The Igbos who also believed in metempsychosis.
 The people of Borno had women who took very great care in selecting a suitable partner. The Borno women were absolutely submissive to their men, and sought to be bodily clean at all times. They would bathe three times a day and use palm oil to anoint their bodies.

In finding a partner, old women of Borno are chosen to examine the new wife, and they bring her to her nuptial bed playing instruments and singing chants of joy, if she is indeed found to be a virgin.

If, however, she is found not to be a virgin, she will be declared a prostitute. Prostitution in Borno was punished by enslavement; Borno prostitutes would be taken by order of the king, shipped to a coastal slave port to be sold to the first European slave ship that arrived.

During child birth, other Borno wise-women serve as nurses to provide aid to the soon-to-be mother. As the child is born and the umbilical cord is cut, the scissors used are placed carefully under the pillow of the baby. The scissors are not used again except for the purpose of cutting the umbilical cord.

New-born babies of Borno are tattooed eight days after their birth with the characteristics of their nation, which are placed on the face, the chest, on the arm, and elsewhere on the body. The designs are of a symmetrical sun, tongues of fire, diverse animals, of reptiles, and of prevalent architecture in their society.

The people of Borno do not eat meat unless it is sacrificed and blessed by their grand-priest, called an alpha. Pork is entirely banned from their diet.

A pilgrim to Borno will follow the main road with jugs filled with water, of which he offers to passer-byes or weary travelers.

Their common money is shells, and they have a great veneration for a prayer book that, if they touch it cannot leave before reading it, singing by memory. The people of Borno would rather sell all of their animals rather than diminish their piety for their sacred laws.

The Borno people have a code of laws for the punishment of crimes, following which require three witnesses to prosecute. Their good faith is so strong that if they are inclined to believe the witnesses, the accused will immediately be hung.

Every house in Borno is like small island surrounding a courtyard. At night, the whole family assembles in the home to avoid savage beasts like leopards & lions.

The King of Borno never leaves his palace, and if someone who enters into the palace dares to fix his eyes on him, he will be punished by death. While the king must make judgements in criminal proceedings, he is seated on a throne and hidden from the vision of the general population by a elegantly fashioned curtain. Any declaration he makes is echoed through the chamber by 7 pipes. The subject to whom the declaration is made indicates his submission to the judgement of the king by giving him his humble recognition, and he kneels, claps with his hands, and covers his head with ashes.

Thievery is abhorred in the society of Borno. If one is found guilty of thievery, the crime is not thought to be individual; indeed the whole family is charged with the crime. For example, if child of Borno takes something that doesn't belong to him, the courtiers of the king take the child and his whole family and sell them as slaves.

If a member of the royal court is found of adultery, he is punished with death. The woman will be drowned and the father and child are impaled and placed on the road to serve as an example.

The people of Borno can hunt once a year. They burn the grass in swamps to fetch the nests of aquatic fowl and take their eggs, and the turtles that hide in the area. As the people don't eat any meat except smoked, these provisions last for the whole year.

The Mozambique people.
The Dahomeans.
The Accrans.
The Crepans.
The Assianthees.
The Popans.
The Fulanis.
The Gabonese.
The Congos were well known for their enjoyment of life. They lived life happily at a sweet and slow pace, and they loved dancing and relaxation; they were known for their great singing.
The Senegalese people were often considered to be the most beautiful of the different African ethnicities found in Saint-Domingue.

The Tacuas.
The Hausas.
The Nago Yoruba people.

European presence in Saint-Domingue

Saint-Domingue was populated by various groups of Europeans, including Frenchmen, Spaniards, Germans, as well as Acadians deported from old Acadia in North America.

In 1764, after the Grand Dérangement had exiled thousands of Acadians from their northern homelands, there was an attempt by French authorities to settle them at Môle-Saint-Nicolas, to shore up France's most lucrative colony of Saint-Domingue and build a base that could be used by the French Navy. It was a disaster, thanks to disease and shortages of food; a visiting French official reported: "The greatest criminal would have preferred the Galleys to a torture session in this plague-stricken place." Within a year, a reported 420 of the 700 Acadian settlers of Môle were dead, and most of the survivors fled to Louisiana shortly thereafter.

Bombardopolis was founded in 1764 by German settlers with the support of the nearby Director of Môle-Saint-Nicolas, Mr. Fusée Aublet. A population of Acadians and Germans who had been living in Louisiana had arrived in Môle-Saint-Nicolas; and the local government wished to separate those of German ancestry from the Acadians, judging the two cultures could not happily coexist. The new community was named after Fusée Aublet's German benefactor, Mr. de Bombarde, a wealthy financier and amateur naturalist.

Royalist curtailment of Creole rights

Despite the cultural progress in Saint-Domingue, tensions between Dominican Creole families and royal administrators escalated. In 1769, St. Dominican planters rallied Creoles of color and petits blancs (white commoners) to help fight an unpopular militia reform. Although the Bourbon government crushed the uprising, it could not stamp out all St. Dominican dissent. St. Dominicans of all classes and colors resented the "tyrannical" royal administration.

European born soldiers died rapidly in tropical locations such as Saint-Domingue, and royal officials preferred a native Creole militia; but the united forces of the St. Dominican planter class, Creoles of color, and  petits blancs posed an enormous threat to Bourbon royalist control.

Starting in the early 1760s, and gaining much impetus after 1769, Bourbon royalist authorities began attempts to cut St. Dominican Creoles of color out of St. Dominican society, banning them from working in positions of public trust or as respected professionals. They began segregating theaters and other public spaces, and issued an edict preventing Creoles of color from dressing extravagantly and restricted their ability to ride in private carriages. They began referring to all St. Dominican Creoles of color as affranchis, a term that means ex-slave, an insult to all Dominican Creoles who came from long-standing free families. Militia companies also became segregated, and St. Dominican Creoles of color who previously served in militias with white St. Dominicans were transferred into "colored" units.

The Bourbon government spread rumors to destroy the St. Dominican society's cohesiveness. Prior to the 1760s, visitors to Saint-Domingue frequently described the great beauty, romance, and allure of the mixed-race Dominican Creole women. Afterwards, they became known as dangerous temptations. Mixed-race men who were known for passion, handsomeness, and chivalry became restereotyped as highly sexual, narcissistic, lazy, and physically weak. This new form of prejudice shattered the older idea of a St. Dominican social continuum; mixed-race men and women were deemed inferior to both white and black St. Dominicans- now, no matter their wealth they were morally and physically inferior to both groups.

The new color line drove the colony's wealthiest families of color into political action. In 1784, Julien Raimond, a Creole of color planter, traveled to France to lobby the naval administrator to reform racist colonial policy implemented by the Bourbon government. More than a dozen wealthy Dominican Creole families supported Raimond's campaign, and continued supporting him in making Dominican Creole rights and equality the most important colonial issue during the years before the French Revolution in Saint Domingue.

Downturn of the St. Dominican economy

As the social systems of Saint Domingue began eroding after the 1760s, the plantation economy of Saint-Domingue also began weakening. The price of slaves doubled between 1750 and 1780; St. Dominican land tripled in price during the same period. Sugar prices still increased, but at a much lower rate than before. The profitability of other crops like coffee collapsed in 1770, causing many planters to go into debt. The planters of Saint Domingue were eclipsed in their profits by enterprising businessmen; they no longer had a guarantee on their plantation investment, and the slave-trading economy came under increased scrutiny.

Along with the establishment of a French abolitionist movement, the Société des amis des Noirs, French economists demonstrated that paid labor or indentured servitude were much more cost-effective than slave labor. In principle the widespread implementation of indentured servitude on plantations could have produced the same output as slave labor. However, the Bourbon King Louis XVI didn't want to change the labor system in his colonies, as slave labor was directly responsible for allowing France to surpass Britain in trade. Nevertheless, Saint-Domingue did increase its reliance on indentured servants (known as petits blanchets or engagés) and by 1789 about 6 percent of all white St. Dominicans were employed as labor on plantations along with slaves.

Despite signs of economic decline, Saint-Domingue continued to produce more sugar than all of the British Caribbean islands combined.

St. Dominicans in the American Revolutionary War

Dominican Creoles such as Vincent Ogé, Jean-Baptiste Chavannes, and André Rigaud fought with American rebel forces during the American Revolutionary War. The Saint-Domingue Volunteers–Chasseurs accompanied the Comte d'Estaing as part of the expeditionary force for service. The unit participated in the Siege of Savannah.

The expeditionary force under the command of d'Estaing and his lieutenant, Jean-Baptiste Bernard Vaublanc, left Cap-Français on 15 August 1779, and arrived on 8 September 1779, in Savannah, Georgia. After arriving they were tasked to help the American rebels attempting to gain control of the city which British forces captured in 1778.

The British Army sortied from their defenses on 24 September before dawn to engage their French and American besiegers. The St. Dominican Chasseurs fought back and lost one man while seven others were wounded, along with Comte D'Estaing. The siege ended in failure on 9 October 1779.

The French did not disband the St. Dominican Chasseurs, but instead continued to use the unit. The Chasseurs did not return to Saint-Domingue until 1780. Afterwards, the majority of the regiment served in Saint-Domingue as garrison troops.

Revolutionary History of Saint-Domingue

The Rebellion of Saint-Domingue

As the French Revolution began in France, Dominican Creole aristocrats also began revolting against French rule. Wealthy Creole planters saw the French Revolution as an opportunity to gain independence from France. The elite planters intended to take control of the island and create favorable trade regulations to further their own wealth and power and to restore social & political equality granted to Dominican Creoles.

Wealthy Creoles such as Vincent Ogé, Jean-Baptiste Chavannes, and the ex-governor of Saint-Domingue Guillaume de Bellecombe incited various revolts, including a slave revolt, aimed at overthrowing the Bourbon Regime. After Rebel Dominican Creole leaders defeated the Bourbon royalists, they lost control of the slave revolt, and to make matters worse, Britain and Spain began to invade the colony. As the rebellion in Saint-Domingue dragged on, it changed in nature from a political revolution to a racial war.

"The rebellion was extremely violent ... the rich plain of the North was reduced to ruins and ashes ..." After months of arson and murder, Toussaint Louverture, a St. Dominican planter and Jacobin, took charge of the leaderless slave revolt; he formed an alliance with Spanish invasion forces.

The Republican revolutionaries in France had written the Declaration of the Rights of Man in 1789, and they to saw that slavery would need to be abolished. They sent a Republican commission with 15,000 troops and tons of arms to Saint-Domingue to abolish slavery and defend from British and Spanish invasion forces.

Republican delegate Léger-Félicité Sonthonax arrived in Saint-Domingue and he made an emancipation proclamation: the proclamation granted specific freedoms to all the slaves, but ultimately, only slaves in the north and west of Saint-Domingue were granted freedom. He was committed to make drastic decisions to prevent Britain and Spain from succeeding in their attempts to assume control over Saint-Domingue.

When the Republicans emancipated the slaves of Saint-Domingue, Toussaint Louverture decided to switch allegiances to the Republican government and double-cross Spain; he was cautious and awaited French ratification of emancipation before officially changing sides. In September and October, emancipation was extended throughout the colony. On February 4, 1794, the French National Convention ratified this act, applying it to all French colonies. Toussaint Louverture and his corps of well-disciplined, battle-hardened former slaves came over to the French Republican side in early May 1794.

Soon after his betrayal, Louverture eradicated all Spanish supporters, and put an end to the Spanish threat to Saint-Domingue. Republican France signed the Treaty of Basel of July 1795 with Spain, ending hostilities between the two countries.

The St. Dominican Civil War and Invasion of Santo Domingo

For months, Louverture was in sole command of Saint-Domingue, except for a semi-autonomous state in the south, where the Dominican Creole general André Rigaud had rejected the authority of the Republican Government. Both generals continued harassing the British, whose position on Saint-Domingue was increasingly weak.

On 30 April 1798, Louverture signed a treaty with the British general Thomas Maitland, exchanging the withdrawal of British troops from western Saint-Domingue in return for a general amnesty for the St. Dominican Bourbon royalists in those areas. In May, Port-au-Prince was returned to French rule in an atmosphere of order and celebration.

In 1799, the tensions between Louverture and Rigaud came to a head. Louverture accused Rigaud of trying to assassinate him to gain power over Saint-Domingue. In June 1799, Louverture declared Rigaud a traitor and attacked the southern state. The resulting civil war, known as the War of Knives, lasted more than a year, with the defeated Rigaud fleeing to Guadeloupe, then France, in August 1800. Louverture delegated most of the campaign to his lieutenant, Jean-Jacques Dessalines, who became infamous, during and after the civil war, for murdering about 10,000 Dominican Creole captives and civilians. During the St. Dominican Civil War, Napoleon Bonaparte gained power in France.

After the civil war, in January 1801, Louverture invaded the Spanish territory of Santo Domingo, taking possession of it from the governor, Don Garcia, with few difficulties. The area was less developed and populated than the French section. Louverture brought it under French law, abolishing slavery and embarking on a program of modernization. He now controlled the entire island.

In March 1801, Louverture appointed a constitutional assembly, composed chiefly of planters, to draft a constitution for Saint-Domingue. He promulgated the Constitution on 7 July 1801, officially establishing his authority over the entire island of Hispaniola. It made him Saint-Domingue's governor-general for life with near absolute powers and the possibility of choosing his successor. However, Louverture did not declare Saint-Domingue's independence, acknowledging in Article 1 that it was a colony of the French Empire.

Many of Saint-Domingue's whites fled the island during the St. Dominican Civil War. Toussaint Louverture, however, understood that they formed a vital part of the St. Dominican economy as a middle class, and in the hopes of slowing the impending economic collapse, he invited them to return. He gave property settlements and indemnities for war time losses, and promised equal treatment in his new Saint-Domingue; a good number of white St. Dominican refugees did return. The refugees who came back to Saint-Domingue and believed in Toussaint Louverture's rule were later exterminated by Jean-Jacques Dessalines.

The Haitian Revolution in Saint-Domingue

Louverture strove to convince Bonaparte of his loyalty. He wrote to Napoleon, but received no reply. Napoleon eventually decided to send an expedition of 20,000 men to Saint-Domingue to restore French authority. Given the fact that France had signed a temporary truce with Great Britain in the Treaty of Amiens, Napoleon was able to plan this operation without the risk of his ships being intercepted by the Royal Navy.

Napoleon dispatched troops in 1802 under the command of his brother-in-law, General Charles Emmanuel Leclerc, to restore French rule to the island. Dominican Creole leaders who were defeated during the St. Dominican Civil War such as André Rigaud and Alexandre Pétion accompanied Leclerc's French expeditionary forces. Both Louverture and Dessalines fought against the French expeditionary forces, but after the Battle of Crête-à-Pierrot, Dessalines defected from his long-time ally Louverture and joined Leclerc's forces.

Eventually, a ceasefire was enacted between Louverture and the French expeditionary forces. During this ceasefire, Louverture was captured & arrested. Jean-Jacques Dessalines was at least partially responsible for Louverture's arrest, as asserted by several authors, including Louverture's son, Isaac. On 22 May 1802, after Dessalines learned that Louverture had failed to instruct a local rebel leader to lay down his arms per the recent ceasefire agreement, he immediately wrote to Leclerc to denounce Louverture's conduct as "extraordinary".

Leclerc originally asked Dessalines to arrest Louverture, but he declined. Jean Baptiste Brunet was ordered to do so, and he deported Louverture and his aides to France, claiming that he suspected the former leader of plotting an uprising. Louverture warned, "In overthrowing me you have cut down in Saint Domingue only the trunk of the tree of liberty; it will spring up again from the roots, for they are numerous and they are deep."

When it became clear that the French intended to re-establish slavery on Saint-Domingue, as they already had on Guadeloupe, Dessalines switched sides again in October 1802, to oppose the French. By November 1802, Dessalines had become the leader of the slave rebellion. Leclerc died of yellow fever, which also killed many French troops. Dessaline's forces achieved a series of victories against the French.

Dessalines named himself Governor-General-for-life of Saint-Domingue on 30 November 1803. On 4 December 1803, the French expeditionary army surrendered its last remaining territory to Dessalines's forces. This officially ended the only slave rebellion in world history which successfully resulted in establishing an independent nation.

On 1 January 1804, from the city of Gonaïves, Dessalines officially declared the former colony's independence and renamed it "Haiti" after the indigenous Taíno name. After the declaration of independence, Dessalines named himself Governor-General-for-life of Haiti and served in that role until 22 September 1804, when he was proclaimed Emperor of Haiti by the generals of the Haitian revolutionary army.

Genocide of the remaining whites in Saint-Domingue

Between February and April 1804, Governor-General-for-life Jean-Jacques Dessalines ordered the genocide of all remaining whites in Haitian territory. He decreed that all those suspected of conspiring in the acts of the expeditionary army should be put to death, including Creoles of color and freed slaves deemed traitors to Dessalines' regime. Dessalines gave the order to the cities of Haiti that all white people should also be put to death. The weapons used should be silent weapons such as knives and bayonets rather than gunfire, so that the killing could be done more quietly, and avoid warning intended victims by the sound of gunfire and thereby giving them the opportunity to escape.

From early January 1804 until 22 April 1804, squads of soldiers moved from house to house throughout Haiti, torturing and killing entire families. Eyewitness accounts of the massacre describe imprisonment and killings  even of whites who had been friendly and sympathetic to the Haitian Revolution.

The course of the massacre showed an almost identical pattern in every city he visited. Before his arrival, there were only a few killings, despite his orders. When Dessalines arrived, he demanded that his orders about mass killings of the area's white population should be put into effect. Reportedly, he ordered the unwilling to take part in the killings, especially men of mixed race, so that the blame should not be placed solely on the black population. Mass killings took place on the streets and in places outside the cities.

In parallel to the killings, plundering and rape also occurred. Women and children were generally killed last. White women were "often raped or pushed into forced marriages under threat of death."

Dessalines did not specifically mention that the white women should be killed, and the soldiers were reportedly somewhat hesitant to do so. In the end, however, the women were also put to death, though normally at a later stage of the massacre than the adult males. The argument for killing the women was that whites would not truly be eradicated if the white women were spared to give birth to new Frenchmen.

Before his departure from a city, Dessalines would proclaim an amnesty for all the whites who had survived in hiding during the massacre. When these people left their hiding place however, they were murdered as well. Some whites were, nevertheless, hidden and smuggled out to sea by foreigners. There were notable exceptions to the ordered killings. A contingent of Polish defectors were given amnesty and granted Haitian citizenship for their renouncement of French allegiance and support of Haitian independence. Dessalines referred to the Poles as "the White Negroes of Europe", as an expression of his solidarity and gratitude.

The Empire of Haiti

 
Dessalines was crowned Emperor Jacques I of the Haitian Empire on 6 October 1804 in the city of Cap-Haïtien. On 20 May 1805, his government released the Imperial Constitution, naming Jean-Jacques Dessalines emperor for life with the right to name his successor. Dessalines declared Haiti to be an all-black nation and forbade whites from ever owning property or land there. The generals who served under Dessalines during the Haitian Revolution became the new planter class of Haiti.

In order to slow the economic collapse of Haiti, Dessalines enforced a harsh regimen of plantation labor on newly freed slaves. Dessalines demanded that all blacks work either as soldiers to defend the nation or return to the plantations as labourers, so as to raise commodity crops such as sugar and coffee for export to sustain his new empire. His forces were strict in enforcing this, to the extent that some black subjects felt they were enslaved again. Haitian society became feudal in nature as workers could not leave the land they worked.

Dessalines was assassinated on 17 October 1806 by rebels lead by Haitian generals Henri Christophe and Alexandre Pétion; his body was found dismembered and mutilated. Dessalines' murder did not solve the tensions in Haiti; instead, the country was torn into two new countries lead by each general. The Northern State of Haiti (later the Kingdom of Haiti) maintained forced plantation labor and became rich, while the Southern Republic of Haiti abandoned forced plantation labor and collapsed economically.

St. Dominicans after the Haitian Revolution

St. Dominicans in New Orleans, Louisiana

St. Dominicans fled to many places in the United States, other Antilles islands, New York City, Cuba, France, Jamaica, and especially New Orleans in Louisiana. More than half of all St. Dominican refugees eventually settled in New Orleans.

St. Dominicans established new sugar, coffee, and tobacco plantations in Cuba, jumpstarting the island's economy, particularly in coffee production. More than 25,000 refugees settled the cities of Baracoa (Guantanamo Province) and Santiago de Cuba. Most of these St. Dominicans were later expelled from Cuba to Louisiana.

Although Spanish and American authorities forbade access of slaves into Cuba and Louisiana, some concessions were made to fleeing St. Dominican refugees. Many of the slaves who accompanied these refugees came willingly, as they feared the bloodshed, murder, pillaging, lawlessness, and economic collapse in Saint-Domingue.

When St. Dominican refugees arrived with slaves, they often followed the old Creole custom, liberté des savanes (savannah liberty), where the owner allowed their slaves to be free to find work at their own convenience in exchange for a flat weekly or monthly rate. They often became domestics, cooks, wig makers, and coachmen.

Although St. Dominicans remained concentrated in the city of New Orleans, some very slowly scattered into surrounding parishes. There, manual labor for agriculture was in greatest demand. The scarcity of slaves made Creole planters turn to petits habitants (Creole peasants), and immigrant indentured servitude to supply manual labor; they complimented paid labor with slave labor. On many plantations, free people of color and whites toiled side-by-side with slaves. This multi-class state of affairs converted many minds to the abolition of slavery.

High yields of the Creole plantations were partially obtained by better agricultural technology, but also by a more rational use of manual labor. The comparison of task completion rates between slave labor and paid labor proved that slave workers produced inferior quality work to paid employees. The maintenance of expensive slave labor then could only be justified by the social status that they conferred upon the proprietary planter. The following passage is the conversation between two Creole planters on the emancipation of slaves.

The large, rich families of old Saint-Domingue were almost nowhere to be found in Louisiana. They no longer possessed the social status from having a large number of slaves and vast plantations. Indeed, the majority the St. Dominican refugees who made a mark on 19th century Louisiana and Louisiana Creole culture came from the lower classes of Saint-Domingue.

There was chronic tension between the Louisiana Creoles and Anglo-Americans, and the reinforcement of the Creole culture by the refugees garnered a major negative reaction. The Americans had counted on their waves of immigration to replace the Creole population with an English-speaking majority. The hopes for rapid Americanization in Louisiana were dashed by the influx of refugees in 1809.

Anglo-Americans harbored much hostility towards the St. Dominican refugees, as they would identify them with the history of their revolution. While Louisiana Creoles embraced the incoming population, Americans found white St. Dominicans to be repulsive, as they would intermingle with people of color, frequenting taverns and drinking with Creoles of color and slaves.

The Dominican Creoles' specialized population raised Louisiana's level of culture and industry, and was one of the reasons why Louisiana was able to gain statehood so quickly. Here is a quote from a Louisiana Creole who remarked on the rapid development of his homeland:

In New York City, the famous French lawyer and gastronome Jean Anthelme Brillat-Savarin found Dominican Creoles in Manhattan; he recounts an encounter with one such refugee:

Jean Baptiste du Sable, believed to be a Dominican Creole, founded Chicago.

Jean Lafitte the pirate king who ruled his kingdom in Barataria Bay of Louisiana, was believed to be a Dominican Creole.

Some St. Dominican refugees did attempt to perpetuate French Revolutionary ideas on their arrival into Louisiana and Cuba, which American and Spanish authorities feared:

Their fears were eventually confirmed; in 1805, Grandjean, a white St. Dominican, and his accomplices attempted to incite a slave rebellion aimed at overthrowing the American government in Louisiana. The plan was foiled by New Orleanian Creoles of color who revealed the plot to American authorities. The Americans sentenced Grandjean and his accomplices to work on a slave chain-gang for the rest of their lives.

St. Dominicans in Haiti

Some St. Dominicans such as François Fournier de Pescay did return to Haiti, where they became Haitian citizens.

Haiti's new elite class styled itself after Dominican Creole customs, and it identified itself as the successor of the Saint-Domingue, promoting Dominican Creole arts & culture and emphasized Saint-Domingue's historical role of being the center of French Creole civilization in the West Indies.

Many Louisiana Creoles of St. Dominican descent fled to Haiti during the American Civil War to escape the bloodshed and economic collapse in Confederate Louisiana. After the Civil War, some Louisiana Creole refugees returned to New Orleans and Louisiana.

Between July 28, 1915, and August 1, 1934, the United States occupied Haiti and established colorism and Jim Crow laws. The racism and violence that occurred during the United States' occupation of Haiti inspired black nationalism among Haitians and left a powerful impression on later Haitian politicians. New nationalist ideas in Haiti emphasized African roots and abandoned the promotion of Haiti's Dominican Creole heritage.

Haitian politicians such as François "Papa Doc" Duvalier promoted a noirist history of the Haitian Revolution, and emphasized the idea of a heroic black slave uprising against evil white slave masters as an allegory for the Haitian people gaining independence from the American occupational forces, both in the hopes of swaying the opinions and votes of the peasant class (the majority of the Haiti's population), and to instill a strong Afro-centric nationalism into the country.

In 2012, Haiti petitioned to be made a member of the African Union, as it claimed to be sufficiently African. However, in May 2016, the African Union Commission announced, "According to Article 29.1 of the AU's Constitutive Act, only African States can join the African Union."  Therefore, "Haiti will not be admitted as a Member State of the African Union."

Culture

Creole French Language

Dominican Creoles of all classes spoke Creole French. There were different registers of Creole French, a lower and higher register, depending on education & class. Creole French served as a Lingua franca throughout the West Indies.

References

Works cited
 
 
 

People of Saint-Domingue